Mark Needham is an American music engineer, mixer and producer. He has worked with many prominent names in music, including: Blue October, Newsboys, Fleetwood Mac, The Killers, Imagine Dragons, Chris Isaak, John Hiatt, Michelle Branch, P!nk, O.A.R., Neon Trees, Shakira, Pete Yorn, Bloc Party, Elton John, Stevie Nicks, Starbenders, and others.

Over the course of more than three decades as an engineer and mixer, Mark Needham has worked with a wide variety of acts from different genres, including Bruce Hornsby, blues legend Charles Brown, and jazz greats Pharoah Sanders, Nat Adderley and Cedar Walton. He first met Lindsey Buckingham when he was brought in at the suggestion of Rob Cavallo to mix what was then to be a solo album for the guitarist in L.A. The two hit it off, and the solo album turned into a Fleetwood Mac disc.

"Mr. Brightside" off The Killers' multi platinum selling album Hot Fuss, was recorded in just a few hours and mixed by Needham on a 12-channel Neve in about 40 minutes.

Needham has been nominated for 12 Grammy Awards, played a major contribution on four certified RIAA platinum records and represented by music manager Andrew Brightman.

Selected discography

Chart positions

References

External links
 ModernMixing.com interview with Mark Needham

American audio engineers
American record producers
Living people
Year of birth missing (living people)
Place of birth missing (living people)